Augustus James (born 1881) was a Negro leagues utility player  for several years before the founding of the first Negro National League. He often played as a second baseman or catcher, and played most of his seasons for the Brooklyn Royal Giants.

References

External links

Negro league baseball managers
Brooklyn Royal Giants players
1881 births
Year of death missing